In public relations,
and in the practice of law, Gibson's law holds that "For every PhD there is an equal and opposite PhD."
The term specifically refers to the conflict between testimony of expert witnesses called by opposing parties in a trial under an adversarial system of justice.
It is also applied to conflicting scientific opinion injected into policy decisions by interested parties creating a controversy to promote their interests.

See also

 Clarke's three laws, including Clarke's fourth law: "For every expert there is an equal and opposite expert."
 Politicization of science
 List of eponymous laws

References

Evidence law
Propaganda
Public relations